Blanche of France (1 April 1328 – 8 February 1393) was the posthumous daughter of King Charles IV of France and his third wife, Joan of Évreux (the daughter of Louis, Count of Évreux and Margaret of Artois). She was the last direct Capetian and the last-surviving member of her family, and her marriage to her second-cousin, Philip, Duke of Orléans, proved childless. With Blanche's death in 1393, the House of Capet continued to exist only via its numerous cadet branches.

Succession
As with his brothers before him, King Charles IV died without a male heir, thus ending the direct line of the House of Capet. Twelve years earlier, a rule against succession by females, arguably derived from the Salic law, had been recognized as controlling succession to the French throne. Application of this rule barred Charles's 1-year-old daughter Marie from succeeding as the monarch.

Jeanne was also pregnant at the time of his death. Since it could have been possible that she would give birth to a son, a regency was set up under Philip of Valois, the closest agnate. After two months, Queen Jeanne gave birth to Blanche. The regent thus became king and in May was consecrated and crowned. At this time, a further rule of succession, again arguably based on the Salic law, was recognized as forbidding not only inheritance by a woman, but also inheritance through a female line.

Marriage
Blanche married on 8 January 1345 her cousin Philip, Duke of Orléans (1336–1375), son of King Philip VI of France and Queen Joan the Lame. They had no children but Philip had illegitimate children. He had died in 1376, his title and lands returning to the royal domain.

Blanche died in 1393 and is buried in the chapel of Notre-Dame in the Basilica of St Denis.

Ancestry

Notes

1328 births
1393 deaths
House of Capet
French princesses
Duchesses of Orléans
Burials at the Basilica of Saint-Denis
Daughters of kings